, or , began in October 1932 when Kyoto Imperial University Faculty of Law Professor Takigawa Yukitoki lectured on the need for the judiciary to understand the social roots of deviance when considering individuals who are before them.  The climactic moment occurred in May 1933, when Education Minister Hatoyama Ichiro announced that Dr. Takigawa's theory of criminal law advocated Marxist philosophies and suspended him from teaching.  The remaining members of the Faculty of Law resigned from their positions in protest, students boycotted classes, and communist sympathisers organised a protest movement. The Ministry of Education suppressed the movement by firing Takigawa.

See also
 No Regrets for Our Youth (1946 film)
 Japanese resistance during the Shōwa period

References

1932 in Japan
Events relating to freedom of expression
Kyoto University
Protests in Japan